The Grand Slam of Darts is a darts tournament organised by the Professional Darts Corporation and is known as the Cazoo Grand Slam of Darts for sponsorship purposes. The PDC also invited the best performing players from its rival, the British Darts Organisation. There have been two previous head-to-head matches between the champions of the two organisations and a few overseas tournaments have also featured BDO v PDC clashes, but this tournament is the first of its kind to be held in the United Kingdom. This arrangement lasted until the BDO's collapse into liquidation in 2020 and it is unclear whether any other organisation will be invited in future.

Since the 2015 edition the tournament is classified as a ranking-tournament, being a non-ranking event at previous editions.

Up until 2017, the tournament was staged each November at the Wolverhampton Civic Hall since it began in 2007. Phil Taylor won the first three finals against Andy Hamilton in 2007, Terry Jenkins in 2008 and Scott Waites in 2009. Taylor did not reach the final in 2010, losing to Steve Beaton in the quarter-finals. Scott Waites won that year, beating James Wade 16–12 in the final having trailed 8–0, making him the only BDO player to win the title. Taylor reclaimed the title in 2011, defeating Gary Anderson 16–4. Raymond van Barneveld defeated Michael van Gerwen 16–14 in the 2012 final, but Taylor regained the trophy in 2013, retained it in 2014, before losing to van Gerwen in 2015. Van Gerwen then retained it in 2016 and again in 2017 before Gerwyn Price won the trophy for the first time in 2018.

In May 2018, the PDC announced that the Grand Slam of Darts trophy would be renamed in honor of the recently deceased Eric Bristow.

That year, with renovations being done to the Civic Hall, the Grand Slam was moved to a new venue, WV Active - Aldersley formerly Aldersley Leisure Village, which is located around 3 miles north-west of Wolverhampton City Centre. Three Grand Slam of Darts events at Aldersley were won by Gerwyn Price (2018, 2019, 2021). In 2020, due to the COVID-19 pandemic in the United Kingdom, the event was held at the Ricoh Arena in Coventry behind closed doors, and was won by José de Sousa. The 2021 edition saw the Grand Slam return to the WV Active - Aldersley where it has been held now. In 2022, the tournament was won by Michael Smith.

Finals

Records and statistics

Total finalist appearances

 Active players are shown in bold

Champions by country

Nine-dart finishes
Five nine-darters have been thrown at the Grand Slam of Darts. The first one was in 2008.

High averages

Previous BDO v PDC tournaments
There have been previous tournaments in which players from both the PDC and BDO have competed. Between 1997 and 2001, several BDO players competed in the World Matchplay and the World Grand Prix – this was as a result of a 1997 Tomlin Order which allowed freedom of players to enter more events. This was later restricted from the start of 2002 onwards, when eligibility rules allowed only Professional Dart Players Association members to compete in the tournaments.

The 2005 Masters of Darts was the first tournament to feature the top players from each organisation. In 2006 and 2007, following Raymond van Barneveld's move to the PDC, the Dutch organisers of the International Darts League and World Darts Trophy invited some top PDC players to compete alongside BDO players.

Perennial participants
As the Grand Slam is an invitational tournament for players who have reached major finals and semi-finals, or been the top of their countries' respective rankings, there is a certain degree of prestige attached to qualifying for the tournament, and even more for entrants who qualify multiple times. Gary Anderson and James Wade qualified for 15 successive tournaments between 2007 and 2021, before missing their first event in 2022.

Television coverage
ITV screened the first four editions of the Grand Slam of Darts, which ended their 19-year absence from regular darts coverage (although they did show a one-off Clash of Champions match between Phil Taylor and Raymond van Barneveld in 1999). The inaugural event saw selected first-round games, the semi-finals, and the final all screened live on ITV1 and the rest of the tournament live on ITV4 but the live coverage was moved entirely to ITV4 in subsequent years, with highlights packages being the only coverage of the event on ITV1.

The tournament proved popular on ITV4, with the 2009 event achieving nine out of the top ten places in the channel's output for that week. Viewing figures ranged from 208,000 to 435,000 with the final itself watched by 454,000. ITV extended their contract with the PDC to show the tournament until at least 2010.

The presenting team consisted of lead presenter Matt Smith, and analysts Alan Warriner-Little and Chris Mason (who replaced Steve Beaton in 2008). The commentating team included Stuart Pyke, who also commentates on darts for Sky Sports, boxing commentator John Rawling, and Peter Drury. Janie Omorogbe provided reporting duties and player interviews.

On 25 January 2011, it was announced that Sky Sports would broadcast the event until 2018. Sky continues to air the event with its current deal running until 2025.

Sponsorship

The sponsors of the event were PartyBets.com (2007) and PartyPoker.com (2008–09), websites operated by Bwin.Party Digital Entertainment, the Daily Mirror newspaper (2010), William Hill (2011–13), Singha Beer (2014–16), bwin (2017–18) and BoyleSports (2019–2020). Cazoo took over as sponsors from 2021, as part of a deal where they will also sponsor the PDC World Cup of Darts and the European Championship.

References

External links
 Grand Slam of Darts page on the PDC website
 Grand Slam of Darts on Darts Database
 Grand Slam of Darts stream on Darts.tv

 
Professional Darts Corporation tournaments
Sport in Wolverhampton
Recurring sporting events established in 2007
2007 establishments in England
Annual sporting events in the United Kingdom